The Centre for Democracy and Development (CDD) was established in the United Kingdom in 1997 and subsequently registered in Lagos, Nigeria, in 1999. The organization aims to promote the values of democracy, peace and human rights in Africa, particularly in the West African sub-region.

The Centre was established to mobilize global opinion and resources for democratic development and provide an independent space to reflect critically on the challenges posed to the democratization and development processes in West Africa, and also to provide alternatives and best practices to the sustenance of democracy and development in the region.

History
The CDD was founded in 1997 in London at a time when Nigeria was under military rule. Its first activity was to organize a roundtable discussion on the future of democracy in Nigeria.
One of the founding members was Biko Agozino, a criminologist whose books explored the impact of colonization on the way racial and ethnic minorities are treated by justice systems worldwide.
The Center works on policy-oriented scholarship on introducing and improving democratic processes, improving economic governance, safety and development throughout Africa. The Centre remains focused on capacity-building work, policy analysis, and advocacy, and as a research reference point on democratic governance, human security, and people-centered development in the region. It has remained a bridge building institution between policymakers, civil society activists, and academics in West Africa.

Activities

CDD has offices in Lagos, Abuja, and Maiduguri in Nigeria and an international office in London.
The center conducts research on democratization and good governance and also trains groups and individuals who are promoting democracy and development in the region.
In collaboration with the Kituo Cha Katiba (East African Centre for Constitutional Development), the CDD has run a capacity-building project funded by the Ford Foundation.
The project sponsors East African Women Lawyers for Graduate Masters Programs.

Promoting democratic accountability through election campaign promises to monitor
Buharimeter project, supported by the Open Society Initiative for West Africa (OSIWA), was a tool designed to track over 222 election pledges made by President Muhammadu Buhari, and the All Progressives Congress (APC) to Nigerians before the 2015 general elections. Sequel to the release of the One Year Assessment report, its key findings were referenced in numerous opinion pieces and articles authored by political commentators and scholars. For example, in July 2016, Emmanuel Ugwu, in his article titled "Why Buhari Must Watch Buharimeter", drew the attention of President Buhari to the importance of Buharimeter as a tool for objective assessment of its administration. According to Ugwu, "Buhari ought to face the mirror of his campaign promises every day of his finite tenure. He should respect the Buharimeter as the reflection of his vows and accomplishments. This will furnish him with the right perspective he needs to secure a befitting legacy." Buharimeter's one-year report did provide a synopsis of citizens' perception of the implications of the actions of the government and also revealed the degree to which Nigerians were aware of campaign promises and the actions carried out to achieve them. Knowledge about the existence of the Buharimeter and its findings have taken a global outlook. Aside from highlighting how the initiative was widely reported internationally, Buharimeter is now listed as one of the promise tracking initiatives on the Duke Reporters' Lab.  The one-year report was the fifth report released since the launch of the project. Others include 30 days, 60 days, 100 days, 7 months' and mid-term assessment reports published in July 2017, and can be viewed on Buharimeter reports. In May 2018, President Muhammadu Buhari would have been in office for 3 years, the Buharimeter team at the Centre for Democracy and Development was expected to release a third-year report which should score the performance of Nigeria's President after 3 years.

Work on Boko Haram insurgence

CDD is one of the first organizations to commence work on addressing the crisis in the North East. The Centre organised the first intervention that brought Borno residents, government and civil society together at the height of the insurgency in 2011. Since then it has organised several fora, developed counter radical narratives, supports the Operation Safe Corridor (OSC) program of the Nigerian Government on Deradicalisation, Rehabilitation of former Boko Haram militants and has a MOU with the Presidential Committee on the North East Initiative.

Work on disinformation and misinformation

The Centre runs a project on Disinformation and Misinformation in Nigeria. It has released several reports on Fake News Ecosystem in Nigeria.

Leadership 
The current Director of CDD is Idayat Hassan, A Yale and Columbia alumni.

References

Human rights organisations based in the United Kingdom